Jan L. Lee (born May 30, 1943) is an American politician who served in the Oregon House of Representatives from 2001 until 2003.

Biography
Lee was born in Santa Barbara, California in 1943. She graduated from Linfield College in 1982, and received a Master of Public Administration from Lewis & Clark College in 1989.

Lee served on the board of the Clackamas Soil and Water Conservation District from 1999 until 2000. She was elected to the Oregon House in 2000 as a Republican, but switched to become an Independent in June 2001. Regarding her switch, she stated, "There is still strong partisanship that stands in the way of bringing people together in the middle to form workable solutions. You cannot force someone to follow hard-line conservative beliefs that do not serve their community and do not reflect their values." She later switched to the Democratic party, and ran as a Democrat for the 51st district in the 2002 elections, where she was defeated by Linda Flores.

On June 4, 2018, Lee was appointed to a vacant seat on the Sandy City Council. She was later defeated by Kathleen Walker in the November 2020 general election.

Personal life
Lee is divorced, and has one child. She resides in  Sandy, Oregon.

See also
 List of American politicians who switched parties in office

References

1943 births
Living people
Lewis & Clark College alumni
Linfield University alumni
Members of the Oregon House of Representatives
Oregon Democrats
Oregon Independents
Oregon Republicans
Politicians from Oregon City, Oregon
People from Santa Barbara, California
Women state legislators in Oregon
American Lutherans
21st-century American politicians
21st-century American women politicians